Sara Ledeboer (1867-1952) was a Dutch painter.

Biography 
Ledeboer was born on 20 August 1867 in Rotterdam. She was mainly self-taught but also attended the Academie voor Beeldende Kunsten (Rotterdam) (Academy of Visual Arts), and the Rijksakademie van beeldende kunsten (State Academy of Fine Arts) in Amsterdam. In 1892 Ledeboer married fellow artist  (1869-1952).

Ledeboer's work was included in the 1939 exhibition and sale Onze Kunst van Heden (Our Art of Today) at the Rijksmuseum in Amsterdam.

Ledeboer died on 21 February 1952 in Rotterdam.

References

External links 
images of Ledeboer's work on Invaluable

1867 births
1952 deaths
Artists from Rotterdam
20th-century Dutch women artists